John Cotton (born 7 November 1940) is a former English cricketer. He was a right-arm fast-medium bowler and tail-end right-handed batsman who played first-class cricket for Nottinghamshire and Leicestershire between 1958 and 1969. 

Cotton was born in Newstead, Nottinghamshire. He made his first-class debut for Nottinghamshire in 1958 at the age of 17 years and 181 days.

Cotton took his best first-class bowling figures in 1967 for Leicestershire against the touring Indian team, when he "utterly demolished the tourists' batting in just over two hours", finishing with 9 for 29 and dismissing the Indians for 63. He took three wickets in four balls for Nottinghamshire against the touring South African team in 1960, and took a hat-trick on the first morning of Leicestershire's match against Surrey at The Oval in May 1965.

References

External links
 

1940 births
Living people
English cricketers
Nottinghamshire cricketers
Leicestershire cricketers
Marylebone Cricket Club cricketers
A. E. R. Gilligan's XI cricketers
People from Newstead, Nottinghamshire
Cricketers from Nottinghamshire